Jason Charles Leffler (September 16, 1975 – June 12, 2013) was an American professional open-wheel and stock car racing driver. Leffler began racing in the open-wheel ranks, competing in the 2000 Indianapolis 500 before moving to primarily NASCAR competition. He died from injuries sustained in a 410 sprint car race at Bridgeport Speedway in Bridgeport, New Jersey.

Racing career

Open wheel career
Leffler began his career racing midget cars in the USAC series, where he won three consecutive midget championships from 1997 and 1999, as well as the Silver Crown series championship in 1998. He was the third driver to win three consecutive midget car championships. He won the Hut Hundred and Belleville Nationals in 1997, and the Turkey Night Grand Prix and Copper Classic in 1999. He won his second Turkey Night Grand Prix in 2005.

Roger Penske met Leffler at the 1998 Hut 100. Leffler's success also caught the attention of Joe Gibbs Racing, a team which had previously signed Tony Stewart from the USAC ranks. Leffler joined the team in 1999 and made four starts in the Busch Series during the season with moderate success. At the same time, he also started a race in the Indy Racing League at Walt Disney World Speedway in the No. 5 Treadway Racing machine, but finished last after crashing early in the race.

Leffler made his first, and only, start in the Indianapolis 500 in 2000.  This effort was put forth by Treadway Racing with backing from Roger Penske's United Auto group.  Leffler qualified in the 17th position, which was also where he finished.

NASCAR career
During the 2000 season, Leffler drove full-time for the No. 18 MBNA sponsored Joe Gibbs Racing team in the Busch Series.  He finished twentieth in the final standings, earned three pole positions during the year, and finished second at Phoenix. He also made two IRL starts, among them a start for Treadway in the Indianapolis 500 where he started and finished seventeenth. After that season he moved up to the Winston Cup Series to become the driver of the #01 Cingular Wireless Dodge for Chip Ganassi Racing as the permanent replacement for Kenny Irwin Jr., who was killed in a practice crash while driving for the same team at New Hampshire in 2000.  Leffler's car retained sponsorship from BellSouth through its Cingular Wireless property, and with Ganassi's purchase of a stake in Felix Sabates' former team came a switch in manufacturer as Leffler became one of several drivers to drive Dodge Intrepids in the brand's return to NASCAR. It was a controversial decision, as Leffler performed poorly the season prior in excellent Joe Gibbs equipment in the Busch series. During his inaugural Cup season, he had only one top 10 finish and four failures to qualify. He was, however, the inaugural pole setter at Kansas Speedway.  After his 37th-place finish in the 2001 championship, Ganassi replaced him with Jimmy Spencer for the 2002 season and remade Leffler's former car into the #41 Target Dodge.

Leffler joined Ultra Motorsports in 2002 to drive the #2 Carquest/Team ASE Dodge Ram in place of the departed Scott Riggs and had great success early on with the team. In his first year, he tied a single season Craftsman Truck Series record by scoring eight pole positions, and qualified no worse than eighth at any race during the season. Despite not winning a race, he had six second-place finishes and a fourth-place finish in the championship. He also won the Night Before the 500 midget race and got to drive Ultra's #7 car in the final two races of the Cup Series season after the team fired Casey Atwood. Leffler finally broke through in 2003 when he scored his first career victory at Dover.

Despite the success, Leffler ended up losing his ride at Ultra in controversial fashion. Haas CNC Racing, which was fielding its first full-time Cup Series team, had fired its driver Jack Sprague after the Tropicana 400. Team owner Gene Haas named John Andretti as his replacement, but he was unavailable for the Brickyard 400 due to a prior commitment with Dale Earnhardt, Inc. Haas approached Leffler to drive the #0 NetZero Pontiac Grand Prix in the race and he agreed to do so. Ultra, which had warned Leffler that such a move would be in violation of his contract, responded by firing him.

Leffler made ten starts in the #0, becoming the permanent driver after the Sirius Satellite Radio at the Glen. The team then signed Ward Burton away from Bill Davis Racing to take over the car, and he joined the team before the season was over to get a head start. Leffler was moved to the #00 Haas Automation car in the Busch Series for the remainder of 2003, with the idea that he would remain there for 2004. At Nashville Superspeedway in 2004, Leffler scored his first career Busch Series victory. He also was involved in a controversial finish at the Winn-Dixie 250; he was penalized by NASCAR for "over-aggressive driving" on the final lap, that saw Michael Waltrip get spun, and then Dale Earnhardt Jr. get wrecked, both by Leffler. He was running third in the points when the team released him from his contract. He ended up finishing twelfth in the championship despite missing the last seven races.

Shortly after his dismissal, Leffler signed a deal to re-join Joe Gibbs Racing for 2005, taking over a newly created Cup team sponsored by FedEx. The No. 11 Chevrolet was regularly outside of the top 35 in points, meaning that it was not guaranteed a starting spot for all races; Leffler was unable to qualify for the Coca-Cola 600 because of it. He was replaced by Terry Labonte for the two road-course races and, eventually, was fired from JGR after nineteen starts in which he failed to record a top ten finish. He was replaced by a mix of Labonte and JGR developmental drivers J. J. Yeley and Denny Hamlin, the latter of whom took over the car full-time the following season.

While racing with Gibbs, Leffler briefly raced with Braun Racing in the Busch Series, a team that had lost their regular driver, Shane Hmiel, to a drug suspension. After leaving Gibbs, Leffler joined Braun Racing on a full-time basis for the remainder of the season. Leffler had scored four top ten finishes with Braun in nine starts for the team.

For the 2006 season, Leffler was signed to return to Braun Racing to drive the No. 32 Chevrolet. The team carried sponsorships from Lucas Oil, Fraternal Order of Eagles, and ABF U-Pack Moving. The No. 32 team became the No. 38 team with sponsorship from Great Clips after it merged with Akins Motorsports. Jason also attempted to qualify for the second to last race of the chase at Phoenix in the No. 71 for Braun Racing but failed to qualify. He also owned the 2006 USAC Silver Crown championship team.

During the 2007 season, Leffler won the pole for the Winn-Dixie 250 at Daytona International Speedway. He finished ninth.  Leffler would make NASCAR history on July 28, 2007 as he passed Greg Biffle with two laps remaining to win the Busch Series Kroger 200 at O'Reilly Raceway Park. The win marked the first race victory for a Toyota Camry in Busch Series competition, and the first win for a foreign manufacturer in a top-tier NASCAR series since Al Keller won in a Jaguar in 1954.  The win also marked Leffler's second career Busch Series win and first win since the 2004 season. Leffler returned to Sprint Cup in 2008 for a few races in the No. 70 Haas CNC Chevy while driving full-time for Braun Racing's No. 38 Toyota Camry.

In 2009 at the July Daytona race weekend it was announced that the No. 38 Toyota car would be shared with Kasey Kahne for the 2010 NASCAR Nationwide Series season. Leffler remained in the Great Clips Toyota in 2010 and 2011. In late 2011 he was informed that he was free to pursue other opportunities for the 2012 season. During the second-to-last race of the 2011 NASCAR Nationwide Series season at Phoenix International Raceway, Leffler was racing with Elliott Sadler, who was 17 points back of first place in the standings coming into the race, and Aric Almirola for 10th when Leffler bumped into the rear bumper of Sadler in turn 3 turning Sadler around and collecting himself, Almirola, Jeremy Clements, and Morgan Shepherd. The wreck ended up costing Sadler the championship as Sadler lost the championship by 45 points to Ricky Stenhouse Jr. Leffler in his interview took full responsibility for what happened between him and Sadler saying that it was his own fault.

On January 9, 2012, Kyle Busch Motorsports announced that Leffler would drive the No. 18 truck for fourteen races with sponsorship from Dollar General. However, strings of bad luck and poor finishes plagued the team, and Leffler was released on August 14.

Leffler also returned to the Cup Series in 2012, driving for Robinson-Blakeney Racing at Watkins Glen International, and for Humphrey Smith Racing at Michigan International Speedway.

Leffler made a single Cup Series start in 2013, driving Humphrey Smith Racing's No. 19 Toyota Camry at Pocono Raceway in early June, three days before his death; he started and parked, finishing 43rd in the event.

Death
On June 12, 2013, at 8:30 PM, Leffler was involved in a crash during a 410 sprint car heat race at the  Bridgeport Speedway in Logan Township, New Jersey. Running second with a few laps left, his car suffered a front suspension failure, causing it to crash into a wall and flip several times.

Leffler instantly lost consciousness in the accident. When it was found that Leffler was not breathing, the rest of the race was cancelled and victory lane ceremonies did not take place. He was transported by ambulance to Crozer-Chester Medical Center in Chester, Pennsylvania, where he was pronounced dead at 9:00 PM EDT, 30 minutes after the accident. An autopsy report stated that the cause of death was a severe blunt force neck and backbone injury.

After his death, many drivers and racing associations such as NASCAR and IndyCar made statements on the death and gave their condolences. NASCAR drivers competing in the 2013 Quicken Loans 400 had special stickers placed on their cars in honor of Leffler. Denny Hamlin, who replaced Leffler in the No. 11 FedEx Toyota in late 2005 had his car repainted to resemble Leffler's livery.

Personal life
Leffler was the son of Charles and Patricia Leffler. Leffler had a son with Alison East, Charlie Dean, who was five years old at the time of his father's death. He shared his life with live-in girlfriend Julianna Patterson; they resided in North Carolina and were engaged at the time of his death.

Career awards
Leffler was inducted into the National Midget Auto Racing Hall of Fame in 2003. He had 19 USAC national championship midget car wins at that time. He was inducted in the USAC Hall of Fame in 2018. He also had six USAC Silver Crown wins.

Motorsports career results

NASCAR
(key) (Bold – Pole position awarded by qualifying time. Italics – Pole position earned by points standings or practice time. * – Most laps led.)

Sprint Cup Series

Daytona 500

Nationwide Series

Camping World Truck Series

 Ineligible for series points

ARCA Bondo/Mar-Hyde Series
(key) (Bold – Pole position awarded by qualifying time. Italics – Pole position earned by points standings or practice time. * – Most laps led.)

American open-wheel racing
(key) (Races in bold indicate pole position)

IndyCar Series

Images

See also
 Driver deaths in motorsport
 List of people from Long Beach, California

References

External links

 

1975 births
2013 deaths
Sportspeople from Long Beach, California
Racing drivers from California
Indianapolis 500 drivers
NASCAR drivers
IndyCar Series drivers
Racing drivers who died while racing
Sports deaths in New Jersey
Burials in North Carolina
ARCA Menards Series drivers
Chip Ganassi Racing drivers
Joe Gibbs Racing drivers
Stewart-Haas Racing drivers
USAC Silver Crown Series drivers
Kyle Busch Motorsports drivers